Tricolia rosea, common name the rosy pheasant, is a species of small sea snail with calcareous opercula, a marine gastropod mollusk in the family Phasianellidae, the pheasant snails.

Description
The height of the shell varies between 2 mm and 5 mm. The minute shell is thin, shining and has an ovate shape. It has a uniform deep rosy color throughout. The four whorls are somewhat flattened at the upper part, then convex. The columella is white. The edge and the outer lip are stained with a line of dark rose.

Distribution
This marine species occurs off Western Australia, New South Wales and Tasmania.

References

External links
 To World Register of Marine Species
 

Phasianellidae
Gastropods described in 1867